

Events

Pre-1600
 636 – Arab–Byzantine wars: The Battle of Yarmouk between the Byzantine Empire and the Rashidun Caliphate begins.
 717 – Arab–Byzantine wars: Maslama ibn Abd al-Malik begins the Second Arab Siege of Constantinople, which will last for nearly a year.
 718 – Arab–Byzantine wars: Raising of the Second Arab Siege of Constantinople.
747 – Carloman, mayor of the palace of Austrasia, renounces his position as majordomo and retires to a monastery near Rome. His brother, Pepin the Short, becomes the sole ruler (de facto) of the Frankish Kingdom.
 778 – The Battle of Roncevaux Pass takes place between the army of Charlemagne and a Basque army.
 805 – Noble Erchana of Dahauua grants the Bavarian town of Dachau to the Diocese of Freising
 927 – The Saracens conquer and destroy Taranto.
 982 – Holy Roman Emperor Otto II is defeated by the Saracens in the Battle of Capo Colonna, in Calabria.
1018 – Byzantine general Eustathios Daphnomeles blinds and captures Ibatzes of Bulgaria by a ruse, thereby ending Bulgarian resistance against Emperor Basil II's conquest of Bulgaria.
1038 – King Stephen I, the first king of Hungary, dies; his nephew, Peter Orseolo, succeeds him.
1057 – King Macbeth is killed at the Battle of Lumphanan by the forces of Máel Coluim mac Donnchada.
1070 – The Pavian-born Benedictine Lanfranc is appointed as the new Archbishop of Canterbury in England.
1096 – Starting date of the First Crusade as set by Pope Urban II.
1185 – The cave city of Vardzia is consecrated by Queen Tamar of Georgia.
1237 – Spanish Reconquista: The Battle of the Puig between the Moorish forces of Taifa of Valencia against the Kingdom of Aragon culminates in an Aragonese victory.
1248 – The foundation stone of Cologne Cathedral, built to house the relics of the Three Wise Men, is laid. (Construction is eventually completed in 1880.)
1261 – Michael VIII Palaiologos is crowned as the first Byzantine emperor in fifty-seven years.
1281 – Mongol invasion of Japan: The Mongolian fleet of Kublai Khan is destroyed by a "divine wind" for the second time in the Battle of Kōan.
1310 – The city of Rhodes surrenders to the forces of the Knights of St. John, completing their conquest of Rhodes. The knights establish their headquarters on the island and rename themselves the Knights of Rhodes.
1430 – Francesco Sforza, lord of Milan, conquers Lucca.
1461 – The Empire of Trebizond surrenders to the forces of Sultan Mehmed II. This is regarded by some historians as the real end of the Byzantine Empire. Emperor David is exiled and later murdered.
1483 – Pope Sixtus IV consecrates the Sistine Chapel.
1511 – Afonso de Albuquerque of Portugal conquers Malacca, the capital of the Malacca Sultanate.
1517 – Seven Portuguese armed vessels led by Fernão Pires de Andrade meet Chinese officials at the Pearl River estuary.
1519 – Panama City, Panama is founded.
1534 – Ignatius of Loyola and six classmates take initial vows, leading to the creation of the Society of Jesus in September 1540.
1537 – Asunción, Paraguay is founded.
1540 – Arequipa, Peru is founded.
1549 – Jesuit priest Francis Xavier comes ashore at Kagoshima (Traditional Japanese date: 22 July 1549).
1592 – Imjin War: At the Battle of Hansan Island, the Korean Navy, led by Yi Sun-sin, Yi Eok-gi, and Won Gyun, decisively defeats the Japanese Navy, led by Wakisaka Yasuharu.
1599 – Nine Years' War: Battle of Curlew Pass: Irish forces led by Hugh Roe O'Donnell successfully ambush English forces, led by Sir Conyers Clifford, sent to relieve Collooney Castle.

1601–1900
1695 – French forces end the bombardment of Brussels.
1760 – Seven Years' War: Battle of Liegnitz: Frederick the Great's victory over the Austrians under Ernst Gideon von Laudon.
1824 – The Marquis de Lafayette, the last surviving French general of the American Revolutionary War, arrives in New York and begins a tour of 24 states.
1843 – The Cathedral of Our Lady of Peace in Honolulu, Hawaii is dedicated. Now the cathedral of the Roman Catholic Diocese of Honolulu, it is the oldest Roman Catholic cathedral in continuous use in the United States.
  1843   – Tivoli Gardens, one of the oldest still intact amusement parks in the world, opens in Copenhagen, Denmark.
1863 – The Anglo-Satsuma War begins between the Satsuma Domain of Japan and the United Kingdom (Traditional Japanese date: July 2, 1863).
1893 – Ibadan area becomes a British Protectorate after a treaty signed by Fijabi, the Baale of Ibadan with the British acting Governor of Lagos, George C. Denton.
1899 – Fratton Park football ground in Portsmouth, England is officially first opened.

1901–present
1907 – Ordination in Constantinople of Fr. Raphael Morgan, the first African-American Orthodox priest, "Priest-Apostolic" to America and the West Indies.
1914 – A servant of American architect, Frank Lloyd Wright, sets fire to the living quarters of Wright's Wisconsin home, Taliesin, and murders seven people there.
  1914   – The Panama Canal opens to traffic with the transit of the cargo ship .
  1914   – World War I: The First Russian Army, led by Paul von Rennenkampf, enters East Prussia.
  1914   – World War I: Beginning of the Battle of Cer, the first Allied victory of World War I.
1915 – A story in New York World newspaper reveals that the Imperial German government had purchased excess phenol from Thomas Edison that could be used to make explosives for the war effort and diverted it to Bayer for aspirin production.
1920 – Polish–Soviet War: Battle of Warsaw, so-called Miracle at the Vistula.
1935 – Will Rogers and Wiley Post are killed after their aircraft develops engine problems during takeoff in Barrow, Alaska.
1939 – Twenty-six Junkers Ju 87 bombers commanded by Walter Sigel meet unexpected ground fog during a dive-bombing demonstration for Luftwaffe generals at Neuhammer. Thirteen of them crash and burn.
  1939   – The Wizard of Oz premieres at Grauman's Chinese Theater in Los Angeles, California.
1941 – Corporal Josef Jakobs is executed by firing squad at the Tower of London at 07:12, making him the last person to be executed at the Tower for espionage.
1942 – World War II: Operation Pedestal: The oil tanker  reaches the island of Malta barely afloat carrying vital fuel supplies for the island's defenses.
1943 – World War II:  Battle of Trahili: Superior German forces surround Cretan partisans, who manage to escape against all odds.
1944 – World War II: Operation Dragoon: Allied forces land in southern France.
1945 – Emperor Hirohito broadcasts his declaration of surrender following the effective surrender of Japan in World War II; Korea gains independence from the Empire of Japan.
1947 – India gains independence from British rule after near 190 years of British company and crown rule and joins the Commonwealth of Nations.
  1947   – Founder of Pakistan, Muhammad Ali Jinnah is sworn in as first Governor-General of Pakistan in Karachi.
1948 – The First Republic of Korea (South Korea) is established in the southern half of the peninsula.
1950 – Measuring  8.6, the largest earthquake on land occurs in the Assam-Tibet-Myanmar border, killing 4,800.
1952 – A flash flood drenches the town of Lynmouth, England, killing 34 people.
1954 – Alfredo Stroessner begins his dictatorship in Paraguay.
1959 – American Airlines Flight 514, a Boeing 707, crashes near the Calverton Executive Airpark in Calverton, New York, killing all five people on board.
1960 – Republic of the Congo (Brazzaville) becomes independent from France.
1961 – Border guard Conrad Schumann flees from East Germany while on duty guarding the construction of the Berlin Wall.
1962 – James Joseph Dresnok defects to North Korea after running across the Korean Demilitarized Zone. Dresnok died in 2016.
1963 – Execution of Henry John Burnett, the last man to be hanged in Scotland.
  1963   – President Fulbert Youlou is overthrown in the Republic of the Congo, after a three-day uprising in the capital.
1965 – The Beatles play to nearly 60,000 fans at Shea Stadium in New York City, an event later regarded as the birth of stadium rock.
1969 – The Woodstock Music & Art Fair opens in Bethel, New York, featuring some of the top rock musicians of the era.
1970 – Patricia Palinkas becomes the first woman to play professionally in an American football game.
1971 – President Richard Nixon completes the break from the gold standard by ending convertibility of the United States dollar into gold by foreign investors.
  1971   – Bahrain gains independence from the United Kingdom.
1973 – Vietnam War: The USAF bombing of Cambodia ends.
1974 – Yuk Young-soo, First Lady of South Korea, is killed during an apparent assassination attempt upon President Park Chung-hee.
1975 – Bangladeshi leader Sheikh Mujibur Rahman is killed along with most members of his family during a military coup.
  1975   – Takeo Miki makes the first official pilgrimage to Yasukuni Shrine by an incumbent prime minister on the anniversary of the end of World War II.
1976 – SAETA Flight 232 crashes into the Chimborazo volcano in Ecuador, killing all 59 people on board; the wreckage is not discovered until 2002.
1977 – The Big Ear, a radio telescope operated by Ohio State University as part of the SETI project, receives a radio signal from deep space; the event is named the "Wow! signal" from the notation made by a volunteer on the project.
1984 – The Kurdistan Workers' Party in Turkey starts a campaign of armed attacks upon the Turkish Armed Forces with an attack on police and gendarmerie bases in Şemdinli and Eruh.
1985 – Signing of the Assam Accord, an agreement between representatives of the Government of India and the leaders of the Assam Movement to end the movement.
1995 – In South Carolina, Shannon Faulkner becomes the first female cadet matriculated at The Citadel (she drops out less than a week later).
  1995   – Tomiichi Murayama, Prime Minister of Japan, releases the Murayama Statement, which formally expresses remorse for Japanese war crimes committed during World War II.
1998 – Northern Ireland: Omagh bombing takes place; 29 people (including a woman pregnant with twins) killed and some 220 others injured.
  1998   – Apple introduces the iMac computer. 
1999 – Beni Ounif massacre in Algeria: Some 29 people are killed at a false roadblock near the Moroccan border, leading to temporary tensions with Morocco.
2005 – Israel's unilateral disengagement plan to evict all Israelis from the Gaza Strip and from four settlements in the northern West Bank begins.
  2005   – The Helsinki Agreement between the Free Aceh Movement and the Government of Indonesia was signed, ending almost three decades of fighting.
2007 – An 8.0-magnitude earthquake off the Pacific coast devastates Ica and various regions of Peru killing 514 and injuring 1,090.
2013 – At least 27 people are killed and 226 injured in an explosion in southern Beirut near a complex used by Lebanon's militant group Hezbollah in Lebanon. A previously unknown Syrian Sunni group claims responsibility in an online video.
  2013   – The Smithsonian announces the discovery of the olinguito, the first new carnivorous species found in the Americas in 35 years.
2015 – North Korea moves its clock back half an hour to introduce Pyongyang Time, 8 hours ahead of UTC.
2020 – Russia begins production on the Sputnik V COVID-19 vaccine.
2021 – Kabul falls into the hands of the Taliban as Ashraf Ghani flees Afghanistan along with local residents and foreign nationals, effectively reestablishing the Islamic Emirate of Afghanistan.

Births

Pre-1600
1013 – Teishi, empress of Japan (d. 1094)
1171 – Alfonso IX, king of León and Galicia (d. 1230)
1195 – Anthony of Padua, Portuguese priest and saint (d. 1231)
1385 – Richard de Vere, 11th Earl of Oxford, English commander (d. 1417)
1432 – Luigi Pulci, Italian poet (d. 1484)
1455 – George, duke of Bavaria (d. 1503)
1507 – George III, Prince of Anhalt-Dessau, German prince (d. 1553)
1575 – Bartol Kašić, Croatian linguist and lexicographer (d. 1650)
1589 – Gabriel Báthory, Prince of Transylvania (d. 1613)

1601–1900
1607 – Herman IV, landgrave of Hesse-Rotenburg (d. 1658)
1608 – Henry Howard, 22nd Earl of Arundel, English politician (d. 1652)
1613 – Gilles Ménage, French lawyer, philologist, and scholar (d. 1692)
1615 – Marie de Lorraine, duchess of Guise (d. 1688)
1652 – John Grubb, American politician (d. 1708)
1702 – Francesco Zuccarelli, Italian painter and Royal Academician (d. 1788)
1717 – Blind Jack, English engineer (d. 1810)
1736 – Johann Christoph Kellner, German organist and composer (d. 1803)
1740 – Matthias Claudius, German poet and author (d. 1815)
1769 – Napoleon Bonaparte, French general and emperor (d. 1821)
1771 – Walter Scott, Scottish novelist, playwright, and poet (d. 1832)
1785 – Thomas De Quincey, English journalist and author (d. 1859)
1787 – Eliza Lee Cabot Follen, American writer, editor, abolitionist (d. 1860)
1798 – Sangolli Rayanna, Indian warrior (d. 1831)
1807 – Jules Grévy, French lawyer and politician, 4th President of the French Republic (d. 1891)
1810 – Louise Colet, French poet (d. 1876)
1824 – John Chisum, American businessman (d. 1884)
1839 – Antonín Petrof, Czech piano maker (d. 1915)
1844 – Thomas-Alfred Bernier, Canadian journalist, lawyer, and politician (d. 1908)
1845 – Walter Crane, English artist and book illustrator (d. 1915)
1856 – Keir Hardie, Scottish politician and trade unionist (d. 1915)
1857 – Albert Ballin, German businessman (d. 1918)
1858 – E. Nesbit, English author and poet (d. 1924)
1859 – Charles Comiskey, American baseball player and manager (d. 1931)
1860 – Florence Harding, American publisher, 31st First Lady of the United States (d. 1924)
1863 – Aleksey Krylov, Russian mathematician and engineer (d. 1945)
1865 – Mikao Usui, Japanese spiritual leader, founded Reiki (d. 1926)
1866 – Italo Santelli, Italian fencer (d. 1945)
1872 – Sri Aurobindo, Indian guru, poet, and philosopher (d. 1950)
1873 – Ramaprasad Chanda, Indian archaeologist and historian (d. 1942)
1875 – Samuel Coleridge-Taylor, English pianist, violinist, and composer (d. 1912)
1876 – Stylianos Gonatas, Greek colonel and politician, 111th Prime Minister of Greece (d. 1966)
1877 – Tachiyama Mineemon, Japanese sumo wrestler, the 22nd Yokozuna (d. 1941)
1879 – Ethel Barrymore, American actress (d. 1959)
1881 – Alfred Wagenknecht, German-American activist and politician (d. 1956)
1882 – Marion Bauer, American composer and critic (d. 1955)
  1882   – Gisela Richter, English archaeologist and art historian (d. 1972) 
1883 – Ivan Meštrović, Croatian sculptor and architect (d. 1962)
1885 – Edna Ferber, American novelist, short story writer, and playwright (d. 1968)
1886 – Bill Whitty, Australian cricketer (d. 1974)
1890 – Jacques Ibert, French composer and educator (d. 1962)
1892 – Louis de Broglie, French physicist and academic, Nobel Prize laureate (d. 1987)
  1892   – Abraham Wachner, New Zealand politician, 35th Mayor of Invercargill (d. 1950)
1893 – Leslie Comrie, New Zealand astronomer and academic (d. 1950)
1896 – Gerty Cori, Czech-American biochemist and physiologist, Nobel Prize laureate (d. 1957)
  1896   – Catherine Doherty, Russian-Canadian activist, founded the Madonna House Apostolate (d. 1985)
  1896   – Paul Outerbridge, American photographer and educator (d. 1958)
1898 – Jan Brzechwa, Polish author and poet (d. 1966)
1900 – Estelle Brody, American silent film actress (d. 1995)
  1900   – Jack Tworkov, Polish-American painter and educator (d. 1982)

1901–present
1901 – Arnulfo Arias Madrid, 21st president of the republic of Panamá (d. 1988)
  1901   – Pyotr Novikov, Russian mathematician and theorist (d. 1975)
1902 – Jan Campert, Dutch journalist and critic (d. 1943)
1904 – George Klein, Canadian inventor, invented the motorized wheelchair (d. 1992)
1909 – Hugo Winterhalter, American composer and bandleader (d. 1973)
1912 – Julia Child, American chef and author (d. 2004)
  1912   – Wendy Hiller, English actress (d. 2003)
1914 – Paul Rand, American graphic designer and art director (d. 1996)
1915 – Signe Hasso, Swedish-American actress (d. 2002)
1916 – Aleks Çaçi, Albanian journalist and author (d. 1989)
1917 – Jack Lynch, Irish footballer and politician, 5th Taoiseach of Ireland (d. 1999)
  1917   – Óscar Romero, Salvadoran archbishop (d. 1980)
1919 – Huntz Hall, American actor (d. 1999)
  1919   – Benedict Kiely, Irish journalist and author (d. 2007)
1920 – Judy Cassab, Austrian-Australian painter (d. 2008)
1921 – August Kowalczyk, Polish actor and director (d. 2012)
1922 – Leonard Baskin, American sculptor and illustrator (d. 2000)
  1922   – Giorgos Mouzakis, Greek trumpet player and composer (d. 2005)
  1922   – Sabino Barinaga, Spanish footballer and manager (d. 1988)
1923 – Rose Marie, American actress and singer (d. 2017)
1924 – Robert Bolt, English playwright and screenwriter (d. 1995)
  1924   – Hedy Epstein, German-American Holocaust survivor and activist (d. 2016)
  1924   – Yoshirō Muraki, Japanese production designer, art director, and fashion designer (d. 2009)
  1924   – Phyllis Schlafly, American lawyer, writer, and political activist (d. 2016)
1925 – Mike Connors, American actor and producer (d. 2017)
  1925   – Rose Maddox, American singer-songwriter and fiddle player (d. 1998)
  1925   – Oscar Peterson, Canadian pianist and composer (d. 2007)
  1925   – Bill Pinkney, American singer (d. 2007)
  1925   – Erik Schmidt, Swedish-Estonian painter and author (d. 2014)
1926 – Julius Katchen, American pianist and composer (d. 1969)
  1926   – Eddie Little Sky, American actor (d. 1997)
  1926   – Sami Michael, Iraqi-Israeli author and playwright
  1926   – John Silber, American philosopher and academic (d. 2012)
  1926   – Konstantinos Stephanopoulos, Greek lawyer and politician, 6th President of Greece (d. 2016)
1927 – Eddie Leadbeater, English cricketer (d. 2011)
  1927   – Oliver Popplewell, English cricketer and judge
1928 – Carl Joachim Classen, German scholar and academic (d. 2013)
  1928   – Malcolm Glazer, American businessman (d. 2014)
  1928   – Nicolas Roeg, English director and cinematographer (d. 2018)
1931 – Ernest C. Brace, American captain and pilot (d. 2014)
  1931   – Richard F. Heck, American chemist and academic, Nobel Prize laureate (d. 2015)
1932 – Abby Dalton, American actress (d. 2020)
  1932   – Robert L. Forward, American physicist and engineer (d. 2002)
  1932   – Jim Lange, American game show host and DJ (d. 2014)
  1932   – Johan Steyn, Baron Steyn, South African-English lawyer and judge  (d. 2017)
1933 – Bobby Helms, American singer-songwriter and guitarist (d. 1997)
  1933   – Stanley Milgram, American social psychologist (d. 1984)
  1933   – Mike Seeger, American folk musician and folklorist (d. 2009)
1934 – Bobby Byrd, American singer-songwriter and producer (d. 2007)
  1934   – Reginald Scarlett, Jamaican cricketer and coach (d. 2019)
  1934   – Valentin Varlamov, Soviet pilot and cosmonaut instructor (d. 1980)
1935 – Jim Dale, English actor, narrator, singer, director, and composer
  1935   – Régine Deforges, French author, playwright, and director (d. 2014)
1936 – Rita Shane, American soprano and educator (d. 2014)
1938 – Stephen Breyer, American lawyer and jurist, Associate Justice of the Supreme Court of the United States
  1938   – Stix Hooper, American jazz drummer
  1938   – Pran Kumar Sharma, Indian cartoonist (d. 2014)
  1938   – Maxine Waters, American educator and politician
  1938   – Janusz Zajdel, Polish engineer and author (d. 1985)
1940 – Gudrun Ensslin, German militant leader, founded Red Army Faction (d. 1977)
1941 – Jim Brothers, American sculptor (d. 2013)
  1941   – Don Rich, American country musician (d. 1974)
1942 – Pete York, English rock drummer 
1943 – Eileen Bell, Northern Irish civil servant and politician, 2nd Speaker of the Northern Ireland Assembly
1944 – Dimitris Sioufas, Greek lawyer and politician, Greek Minister of Health (d. 2019)
1945 – Khaleda Zia, Bangladeshi politician, Prime Minister of Bangladesh
1946 – Jimmy Webb, American singer-songwriter and pianist
1947 – Rakhee Gulzar, Indian film actress
1948 – Patsy Gallant, Canadian singer-songwriter and actress
  1948   – Tom Johnston, American singer-songwriter and guitarist 
1950 – Tommy Aldridge, American drummer 
  1950   – Tom Kelly, American baseball player
  1950   – Anne, Princess Royal of the United Kingdom
1951 – Ann Biderman, American screenwriter and producer
  1951   – Bobby Caldwell, American singer-songwriter (d. 2023)
  1951   – John Childs, English cricketer
1952 – Chuck Burgi, American drummer 
1953 – Carol Thatcher, English journalist and author
  1953   – Mark Thatcher, English businessman
  1953   – Wolfgang Hohlbein, German author
1954 – Stieg Larsson, Swedish journalist and author (d. 2004)
1956 – Lorraine Desmarais, Canadian pianist and composer
  1956   – Freedom Neruda, Ivorian journalist
  1956   – Robert Syms, English businessman and politician
1957 – Željko Ivanek, Slovenian-American actor
1958 – Simon Baron-Cohen, English-Canadian psychiatrist and author
  1958   – Craig MacTavish, Canadian ice hockey player and coach
  1958   – Simple Kapadia, Indian actress and costume designer (d. 2009)
  1958   – Victor Shenderovich, Russian journalist and radio host
1959 – Scott Altman, American captain, pilot, and astronaut
1961 – Ed Gillespie, American political strategist 
  1961   – Matt Johnson, English singer-songwriter and musician 
  1961   – Gary Kubiak, American football player and coach
  1961   – Suhasini Maniratnam, Indian actress and screenwriter
1962 – Tom Colicchio, American chef and author
  1962   – Rıdvan Dilmen, Turkish footballer and manager
  1962   – Inês Pedrosa, Portuguese writer
  1962   – Vilja Savisaar-Toomast, Estonian lawyer and politician
1963 – Alejandro González Iñárritu, Mexican director, producer, and screenwriter
  1963   – Simon Hart, Welsh soldier and politician
  1963   – Jack Russell, England cricketer and coach
1964 – Jane Ellison, English lawyer and politician
  1964   – Melinda Gates, American businesswoman and philanthropist, co-founded the Bill & Melinda Gates Foundation
1965 – Rob Thomas, American author, screenwriter, and producer
1966 – Scott Brosius, American baseball player and coach
  1966   – Dimitris Papadopoulos, Greek basketball player and coach
1967 – Tony Hand, Scottish ice hockey player and coach
  1967   – Peter Hermann, American actor
1968 – Debra Messing, American actress
1969 – Bernard Fanning, Australian singer-songwriter 
  1969   – Carlos Roa, Argentine footballer
1970 – Anthony Anderson, American comedian, actor, and producer
  1970   – Ben Silverman, American actor, producer, and screenwriter, founded Electus Studios
1971 – Adnan Sami, Indian singer, musician, music composer, pianist and actor
1972 – Ben Affleck, American actor, director, producer, and screenwriter
  1972   – Jennifer Alexander, Canadian ballerina (d. 2007)
  1972   – Mikey Graham, Irish singer
1974 – Natasha Henstridge, Canadian model and actress
  1974   – Tomasz Suwary, Polish footballer
1975 – Bertrand Berry, American football player and radio host
  1975   – Vijay Bharadwaj, Indian cricketer and coach
  1975   – Brendan Morrison, Canadian ice hockey player
  1975   – Kara Wolters, American basketball player
1976 – Boudewijn Zenden, Dutch footballer and manager
1977 – Martin Biron, Canadian ice hockey player
  1977   – Anthony Rocca, Australian footballer and coach
1978 – Waleed Aly, Australian journalist and television host
  1978   – Lilia Podkopayeva, Ukrainian gymnast
  1978   – Stavros Tziortziopoulos, Greek footballer
  1978   – Kerri Walsh Jennings, American volleyball player
1979 – Carl Edwards, American race car driver
1980 – Fiann Paul, Icelandic explorer
1981 – Brendan Hansen, American swimmer
  1981   – Óliver Pérez, American baseball player
1982 – Casey Burgener, American weightlifter
  1982   – Germán Caffa, Argentine footballer
  1982   – David Harrison, American basketball player
1983 – Siobhan Chamberlain, English association football goalkeeper
1985 – Nipsey Hussle, American rapper (d. 2019)
  1985   – Emily Kinney, American actress, singer, and songwriter
1987 – Ryan D'Imperio, American football player
  1987   – Michel Kreder, Dutch cyclist
  1987   – Sean McAllister, English footballer
1988 – Oussama Assaidi, Moroccan footballer
1989 – Joe Jonas, American singer-songwriter 
  1989   – Ryan McGowan, Australian footballer
  1989   – Carlos PenaVega, American actor and singer
  1989   – Jordan Rapana, New Zealand rugby league player
1990 – Jennifer Lawrence, American actress
1991 – Petja Piiroinen, Finnish snowboarder
1992 – Baskaran Adhiban, Indian chess player
1993 – Rieah Holder, Barbadian netball player
  1993   – Clinton N'Jie, Cameroonian footballer
  1993   – Alex Oxlade-Chamberlain, English footballer
1994 – Lasse Vigen Christensen, Danish footballer
  1994   – Kosuke Hagino, Japanese swimmer
1995 – Chief Keef, American rapper
1999 – Paola Reis, BMX rider

Deaths

Pre-1600
 398 – Lan Han, official of the Xianbei state Later Yan
 423 – Honorius, Roman emperor (b. 384)
 465 – Libius Severus, Roman emperor (b. 420)
767 – Abu Hanifa, Iraqi scholar and educator (b. 699)
 778 – Roland, Frankish military leader
 873 – Yi Zong, Chinese emperor (b. 833)
 874 – Altfrid, bishop of Hildesheim 
 912 – Han Jian, Chinese warlord (b. 855)
 932 – Ma Xisheng, Chinese governor and king (b. 899)
 978 – Li Yu, ruler ('king') of Southern Tang 
 986 – Minnborinus, Irish missionary and abbot
1022 – Nikephoros Phokas Barytrachelos, Byzantine rebel
1038 – Stephen I, Hungarian king (b. 975)
1057 – Macbeth, King of Scotland
1118 – Alexios I Komnenos, Byzantine emperor (b. 1048)
1196 – Conrad II, Duke of Swabia (b. 1173)
1224 – Marie of France, Duchess of Brabant (b. 1198)
1257 – Saint Hyacinth of Poland
1274 – Robert de Sorbon, French theologian and educator, founded the College of Sorbonne (b. 1201)
1275 – Lorenzo Tiepolo, Doge of Venice
1328 – Yesün Temür, emperor of the Yuan Dynasty (b. 1293)
1369 – Philippa of Hainault, Queen consort of Edward III of England (b. 1314)
1388 – Adalbertus Ranconis de Ericinio, Bohemian theologian and rector of the University of Paris (b. circa 1320)
1399 – Ide Pedersdatter Falk, Danish noblewoman (b. 1358)
1496 – Infanta Isabella of Portugal, Queen of Castile and León (b. 1428)
1506 – Alexander Agricola, Flemish composer (b. c. 1445)
1507 – John V, Duke of Saxe-Lauenburg (b. 1439)
1528 – Odet of Foix, Viscount of Lautrec, French general (b. 1485)
1552 – Hermann of Wied, German archbishop (b. 1477)
1594 – Thomas Kyd, English playwright (b. 1558)

1601–1900
1621 – John Barclay, Scottish poet and author (b. 1582)
1666 – Johann Adam Schall von Bell, German missionary and astronomer (b. 1591)
1714 – Constantin Brâncoveanu, Romanian prince (b. 1654)
1728 – Marin Marais, French viol player and composer (b. 1656)
1758 – Pierre Bouguer, French mathematician, geophysicist, and astronomer (b. 1698)
1799 – Giuseppe Parini, Italian poet and author (b. 1729)
1844 – José María Coppinger, governor of Spanish East Florida (b. 1733)
1852 – Johan Gadolin, Finnish chemist, physicist, and mineralogist (b. 1760)
1859 – Nathaniel Claiborne, American farmer and politician (b. 1777)

1901–present
1907 – Joseph Joachim, Hungarian violinist, composer, and conductor (b. 1831)
1909 – Euclides da Cunha, Brazilian sociologist and journalist (b. 1866)
1917 – Thomas J. Higgins, American sergeant, Medal of Honor recipient (b. 1831)
1925 – Konrad Mägi, Estonian painter and educator (b. 1878)
1928 – Anatole von Hügel, Italian ethnologist and academic, co-founded St Edmund's College, Cambridge (b. 1854)
1935 – Wiley Post, American pilot (b. 1898)
  1935   – Will Rogers, American actor, comedian, and screenwriter (b. 1879)
  1935   – Paul Signac, French painter and author (b. 1863)
1936 – Grazia Deledda, Italian novelist and poet, Nobel Prize laureate (b. 1871)
1942 – Mahadev Desai, Indian activist and author (b. 1892)
1945 – Korechika Anami, Japanese general and politician, 54th Japanese Minister of the Army (b. 1887)
  1945   – Fred Hockley, English lieutenant and pilot (b. 1923)
1951 – Artur Schnabel, Polish pianist and composer (b. 1882)
1953 – Ludwig Prandtl, German physicist and engineer (b. 1875)
1962 – Lei Feng, Chinese soldier (b. 1940)
1967 – René Magritte, Belgian painter (b. 1898)
1971 – Paul Lukas, Hungarian-American actor (b. 1887)
1975 – Sheikh Mujibur Rahman, Bengali politician, 1st President of Bangladesh (b. 1920)
  1975   – Clay Shaw, American businessman (b. 1913)
  1975   – Harun Karadeniz, Turkish political activist and author (b. 1942)
1981 – Carol Ryrie Brink, American author (b. 1895)
  1981   – Jørgen Løvset,  Norwegian gynaecologist and academic (b. 1896)
1982 – Ernie Bushmiller, American cartoonist (b. 1905)
  1982   – Jock Taylor, Scottish motorcycle sidecar racer (b. 1954)
  1982   – Hugo Theorell, Swedish biochemist and academic, Nobel Prize laureate (b. 1903)
1989 – Minoru Genda, Japanese general, pilot, and politician (b. 1904)
  1989   – Thrasyvoulos Tsakalotos, Greek general and diplomat (b. 1897)
1990 – Viktor Tsoi, Russian musician and actor (b. 1962)
1992 – Linda Laubenstein, American physician and academic (b. 1947)
1994 – Wout Wagtmans, Dutch cyclist (b. 1929)
1995 – John Cameron Swayze, American journalist and actor (b. 1906)
1997 – Ida Gerhardt, Dutch poet and educator (b. 1905)
1999 – Hugh Casson, English architect and interior designer (b. 1910)
2000 – Lancelot Ware, English barrister and biochemist, co-founder of Mensa (b. 1915)
2001 – Yavuz Çetin, Turkish singer-songwriter (b. 1970)
  2001   – Richard Chelimo, Kenyan runner (b. 1972)
  2001   – Kateryna Yushchenko, Ukrainian computer scientist and academic (b. 1919)
2004 – Sune Bergström, Swedish biochemist and academic, Nobel Prize laureate (b. 1916)
  2004   – Amarsinh Chaudhary, Indian politician, 8th Chief Minister of Gujarat (b. 1941)
2005 – Bendapudi Venkata Satyanarayana, Indian dermatologist and academic (b. 1927)
2006 – Te Atairangikaahu, New Zealand queen (b. 1931)
  2006   – Rick Bourke, Australian rugby league player (b. 1955)
  2006   – Coenraad Bron, Dutch computer scientist and academic (b. 1937)
  2006   – Faas Wilkes, Dutch footballer and manager (b. 1923)
2007 – Richard Bradshaw, English conductor and director (b. 1944)
  2007   – John Gofman, American biologist, chemist, and physicist (b. 1918)
  2007   – Geoffrey Orbell, New Zealand physician (b. 1908)
  2007   – Sam Pollock, Canadian businessman (b. 1925)
2008 – Vic Toweel, South African-Australian boxer (b. 1929)
  2008   – Jerry Wexler, American journalist and producer (b. 1917)
2011 – Rick Rypien, Canadian ice hockey player (b. 1984)
2012 – Bob Birch, American bass player and saxophonist (b. 1956)
  2012   – Altamiro Carrilho, Brazilian flute player and composer (b. 1924)
  2012   – Harry Harrison, American author and illustrator (b. 1925)
2013 – Rosalía Mera, Spanish businesswoman, co-founded Inditex and Zara (b. 1944)
  2013   – Sławomir Mrożek, Polish-French author and playwright (b. 1930)
  2013   – Marich Man Singh Shrestha, Nepali politician, 28th Prime Minister of Nepal (b. 1942)
  2013   – August Schellenberg, Canadian actor (b. 1936) 
2014 – Licia Albanese, Italian-American soprano and actress (b. 1909)
2015 – Julian Bond, American academic, leader of the civil rights movement, and politician (b. 1940)
  2015   – Hamid Gul, Pakistani general (b. 1936)
2017 – Gunnar Birkerts, Latvian-American architect (b. 1925)
2020 – Robert Trump, American real-estate developer, business executive (b. 1948)
2021 – Gerd Müller, German footballer (b. 1945)

Holidays and observances
 Armed Forces Day (Poland)
 Christian feast day:
 Altfrid
 Alypius of Thagaste
 Feast day of the Assumption of Mary, one of the Catholic holy days of obligation. (a public holiday in Austria, Belgium, Benin, Bosnia, Burundi, Cameroon, Chile, Colombia, Croatia, Cyprus, France, some states in Germany, Greece, Guatemala, Italy, Ivory Coast, Lebanon, Liechtenstein, Lithuania, Luxembourg, Madagascar, Malta, Mauritius, Paraguay, Poland, Portugal, Romania, Senegal, Seychelles, Slovenia, Spain, Switzerland, Togo, and Vanuatu); and its related observances:
Feast of the Dormition of the Theotokos (Eastern Orthodox, Oriental Orthodox and Eastern Catholic Churches)
 Ferragosto (Italy)
 Lady's Day (Ireland)
 Māras (Latvia)
 Mother's Day (Antwerp and Costa Rica)
 National Acadian Day (Acadians)
Navy Day (Romania)
 Virgin of Candelaria, patron of the Canary Islands. (Tenerife, Spain)
San La Muerte (Paraguayan Folk Catholicism)
Santa Muerte (Mexican Folk Catholicism)
 Tarcisius
 August 15 (Eastern Orthodox liturgics)
 Constitution Day (Equatorial Guinea)
 Founding of Asunción (Paraguay)
 Independence Day, celebrates the independence of Korea from Japan in 1945:
 Gwangbokjeol, "Independence Day" (South Korea)
 Jogukhaebangui nal, "Fatherland Liberation Day" (North Korea)
 Independence Day, celebrates the independence of India from the United Kingdom in 1947.
 Independence Day, celebrates the independence of the Republic of the Congo from France in 1960.
 National Day (Liechtenstein)
 National Mourning Day, observed on Srabon 31 (Bangladesh)
 The first day of Flooding of the Nile, or Wafaa El-Nil (Egypt and Coptic Church)
 The main day of Bon Festival (Japan), and its related observances:
 Awa Dance Festival (Tokushima Prefecture)
 Victory over Japan Day (United Kingdom), and its related observances:
 End-of-war Memorial Day, when the National Memorial Service for War Dead is held (Japan)

References

External links

 
 
 

Days of the year
August